All Wet is the sixth studio album by French musician Mr. Oizo. The album was released on September 30, 2016 under Ed Banger Records.

Track listing 
All tracks composed by Quentin Dupieux except where noted.

Charts

References

Ed Banger Records albums
Mr. Oizo albums
2016 albums